Vitalie Marinuța (born 16 June 1970) is a Moldovan politician and former military officer who served as Minister of Defense of Moldova between 25 September 2009 and 27 February 2014.

Education 
 Bachelor of Science in International Relations, University of Political and Economic European studies Chisinau, Republic of Moldova (2007)
 Master of Arts in Security Studies (civil-military relations), US Naval Postgraduate School Monterey, California, United States (2004)
 Military interpreter (French), Ryazan Higher Airborne Command School (1992)
 Defense against suicide terrorism course, NATO Center of Excellence, Ankara, Turkey (2005)
 Defense restructuring course, Center for Civil-Military Relations,	Monterey, California, United States (2004)
 Command and Staff officers course, United States Army Command and General Staff College, Ft. Leavenworth, Kansas, United States (2000).

Military and Political Background
He first became a platoon leader in a special forces company in the 1990s, before becoming the military commander of the 22nd Peacekeeping Battalion from October 2000 to December 2002. During this time, he also studied at the Ryazan Higher Airborne Command School in Russia. He would later become a strategy & policy planner for CENTCOM, Tampa, Florida. From 2006-2007, Marinuța planned and organized activities for international cooperation of the Ministry of Defense with the United Nations, NATO, the OSCE, and the Commonwealth of Independent States.

Minister of Defense (2009-2014)

Marinuta was appointed to the post of Minister of Defense after a vote of confidence by the Parliament of Moldova and the Filat Cabinet on 25 September 2009. On the same day, he was sworn in by the interim President of Moldova, Mihai Ghimpu. He also simultaneously served as Chief of the General Staff until 2011. He played a key role in raising the Moldovan National Army's standards to the standards of Nato. Marinuţa, announced his resignation in February 2014 after having previously criticized the leadership of the ministry and the National Army.

See also 
First Filat Cabinet
Second Filat Cabinet

Notes

 

1970 births
Living people
Liberal Party (Moldova) politicians
Moldovan Ministers of Defense
Moldovan generals
Romanian people of Moldovan descent